The Islamabad Chamber of Commerce and Industry (ICCI) was established in 1984 and incorporated under the Companies Act VII of 1913 on 26 August 1984 as a Limited Company by Guarantee. Its registered office is in Islamabad and its jurisdiction spreads over the entire Federal Capital Area (urban and rural). As per the new Trade Ordinance and Rule 2007, ICCI got a new license in April 2007

ICCI Office Bearers (2022–2024) 

 Mr. Ahsan Zafar Bakhtawari (President)
 Mr. Faad Waheed (Senior Vice President)
 Mr. (Engr.) Azhar ul Islam Zafar   (Vice President)

Past presidents of ICCI 

 Mr. Anayat Ullah Mirza  1984–1986
 Mr. Muqeem Ahmed Khan   1987
 Mr. Muhammad Raza Khan   1988
 Mr. Muhammad Siddique Butt  1989
 Mr. Khalid Masood Bhola   1990
 Mian Shaukat Masud   1991
 Mr. Shahid Rashid Butt   1992
 Muhammad Aslam    1993
 Mr. Shahid Rashid Butt   1994
 Mr. Khalid Javaid   1995
 Mr. Munawar Mughal   1996–1997
 Mian Akram Farid   1997–1998
 Sheikh Baser Daud   1998–1999
 Mr. Waqar Aslam Hamdi   1999–2000
 Mr. Mohsin Khalid   2000–2001
 Mr. Munawar Mughal   2001–2002
 Mian Akram Farid   2002–2003
 Mr. Zubair Ahmed Malik   2003–2004
 Mr. Tariq Sadiq   2004–2005
 Mr. Abdul Rauf    2005–2006
 Mr. Muhammad Nasir Khan  2006–2007
 Mr. Muhammad Ijaz Abbasi  2007–2008
 Mian Shaukat Masud  2008–2009
 Mr. Zahid Maqbool  2009–2010
 Mr. Mahfooz Elahi  2010–2011
 Mr. Yassar Sakhi Butt  2011–2012
 Mr. Zafar Bakhtawari  2012–2013
 Mr. Mr.Shaban Khalid Ch 2013–2014
 Mr. Mr.Muzzamil Hussain Sabri 2014–15
 Mr. Atif Ikram Sheikh 2015–16
 Mr. Khalid Iqbal Malik 2016–17
 Mr. Sheikh Amir Waheed 2017-18
 Mr. Ahmed Mughal 2018-19
 Mr. Ahmed Waheed 2019-20
 Mr. Yasir Ilyas 2020-21
 Mr. Shakeel Munir 2021-22

Business development 

Islamabad Chamber of Commerce and Industry trying to improve membership services through access to various information resources.
Under this grant, the Islamabad Chamber of Commerce and Industry (ICCI) undertook to conduct a training needs assessment survey of its members in order to determine the services it can offer to its members. The survey results were used to establish business support services to fulfill the needs identified. ICCI also undertook to conduct a series of workshops on youth and women entrepreneurship.

See also 
Islamabad
Economy of Pakistan
Karachi Chamber of Commerce & Industry
Lahore chamber
 Pakistan

References 

Chambers of commerce
Economy of Islamabad